Saša Novak Radulović (born 22 December 1964) is a Croatian guitarist. He is the former guitarist and producer from the band Psihomodo pop. 
He started his career in Karlovac as the leader of the famous local punk-rock band Nužni izlaz.

He has also played with some of the best Croatian musicians and authors as Drago Mlinarec, Dino Dvornik, and Ivan Piko Stančić as the duo Novak and Kopola in the project "Rock Academy" as well.
Saša Novak Radulović is known as one of the best guitarist and performers in ex Yugoslavia and Croatia. In his biography, glam-rock project Virusi was one of the most interesting revivals on the Croatian scene. Together with the band Psihomodo pop was created a serial of fairy tales in rock style made for kids. 
Interesting collaborations were made with La Video and Drago Mlinarec as well as La Video and Mirta Zečević (Croatian actress).

Living in Germany, he is still active as record producer and musician.

Discography

Studio albums 
Godina zmaja  (Jugoton, 1988)
Sexy magazin  (Jugoton, 1990)
Tko je ubio Mickey Mousa (Croatia Records, 1992)
Srebrne svinje (Croatia Records, 1994)

Live albums 
Live in Amsterdam (Jugoton, 1989)
ZG Rock forces (Jugoton, 1990)

With Novak and Kopola 

Rock akademija (HRT Orfej, 1991)

With Ivan Piko Stančić 

Bubnjevi na suncu (Orfej, 1991)

Various artists compilations 
Blue moon - with Greaseballs and Fantomi (Croatia Records, 1995)
Rock za Hrvatsku 1 - 3 ("with Novak and Kopola, Fantomi, Le Cinema, Drago Mlinarec,") (Croatia Records, 1996)
Crockabilly - with Fantomi and Greaseballs (Aquarius Records, 1995)

Solo 
Free (Rebeat Digital GmbH, 2009) with Hit Single I Love You Love Me Love
Once upon a time (i was a rock'n'roll star) (OHHO Records, 2011,2017)
Ja sam tu ( Croatia Records, 2018)

References
Janjatović, Petar. Ilustrovana Enciklopedija Yu Rocka 1960-1997, publisher: Geopoetika, 1997 
Svaštara.com. Biografija Psihomodo pop

1964 births
Croatian rock guitarists
Croatian record producers
Musicians from Zagreb
Croatian expatriates in Germany
Living people